Robert "Bob" Delvey Wetmore, Sr. (July 24, 1930 – January 15, 2016) was an American politician from Massachusetts.

Career
Born to Elmer Marshall and Marion Ray Parmenter, Wetmore is a graduate of Gardner High School. He then went on to receive degrees from Worcester Junior College, Clark University, College of the Holy Cross in Industrial Relations, and New England Law Boston. In 1952, Wetmore was drafted to serve in the Korean War, and later joined the Veterans of Foreign Wars. Early in his career, he spent time as a lineworker.

Wetmore served in the Massachusetts House of Representatives for the 2nd Worcester District from 1964 to 1976, and then in the Massachusetts Senate for the  Worcester, Hampden, Hampshire, and Middlesex District from 1976 to 1997. While in the Senate, he served on the Committee on Commerce and Labor and the Senate Ways and Means Committee. From 1980 to 1988, his successor in the Senate, Stephen Brewer, was his aide. Wetmore is known for his legislation work to preserve the Quabbin Reservoir and Ware River, as well as advocacy for Article 97 of the Constitution of Massachusetts.

In 2004, the Mount Wachusett Community College dedicated a new building as the Robert D. Wetmore Center for Innovation in Design, Technology and Resource Development.

Personal life
Prior to his death, caused by Parkinson's disease, in 2016, Wetmore lived on Hubbardston Road in Barre, Massachusetts. He was also a member of the American Legion and the Lions Clubs International.

References

External links
Commonwealth of Massachusetts profile

1930 births
2016 deaths
People from Gardner, Massachusetts
Clark University alumni
College of the Holy Cross alumni
New England Law Boston alumni
American military personnel of the Korean War
Democratic Party members of the Massachusetts House of Representatives
Democratic Party Massachusetts state senators
Deaths from Parkinson's disease
Neurological disease deaths in Massachusetts